The 2008 FIBA Europe Under-20 Championship was the eleventh edition of the FIBA Europe Under-20 Championship. The city of Riga, in Latvia, hosted the tournament. Serbia won their second title.

Bulgaria and Georgia were relegated to Division B.

Teams

Squads

Preliminary round
The sixteen teams were allocated in four groups of four teams each.

Group A

Group B

Group C

Group D

Qualifying round
The twelve teams were allocated in two groups of six teams each. The results of the games between the teams from the same group in the preliminary round were taken into account for the ranking in this round.

Group E

Group F

Classification round

Group G

Knockout stage

9th–12th playoffs

5th–8th playoffs

Championship

Final standings

Stats leaders

Points

Rebounds

Assists

All-Tournament Team
  Miroslav Raduljica
  Joaquin Colom
  Martynas Gecevičius
  Víctor Claver
  Vladimir Dašić

See also
U20 European Championship Men 2008 – Division B

References
FIBA Archive
FIBA Europe Archive

FIBA U20 European Championship
2008–09 in European basketball
2008–09 in Latvian basketball
International youth basketball competitions hosted by Latvia